The Phacidiaceae are a family of fungi in the order Helotiales.
 According to a 2008 estimate, the family contained seven genera and 148 species.

Genera
As accepted by GBIF;

 Allantophomopsiella  (1)
 Allantophomopsis  (5)
 Apostrasseria  (1)
 Ascocoma  (1)
 Bacilliformis (1)
 Basilocula (1)
 Bulgaria (9)
 Calvophomopsis (1)
 Ceuthospora  (67)
 Chondrostroma (1)
 Coma  (1)
 Cornibusella (1)
 Darkera  (7)
 Gloeopycnis (1)
 Leptoteichion (1)
 Melanostroma (2)
 Myxophacidium (1)
 Neonaumovia (1)
 Phacidiopycnis (6)
 Phacidites  (1)
 Phacidium  (57)
 Potebniamyces (3)
 Pseudophacidium (11)
 Siroplaconema (1)
 Starbaeckia  (1)
 Strasseria  (13)

Figures in brackets are approx. how many species per family.

References

Helotiales